Victor Alexander da Silva (born 23 July 1999), commonly known as Vitinho, is a Brazilian professional footballer who plays as a right-back for EFL Championship club Burnley.

Club career
Vitinho arrived at Cruzeiro Esporte Clube when he was six-years-old. In the 2018 U-20 Copa Libertadores, he scored two goals in three matches, and was promoted to the first squad. Soon after, Brazil U20 coach Carlos Amadeu, called up Vitinho for the Brazilian Under-20 National team.

On 19 May 2018 he made his debut for Cruzeiro, replacing Robinho in the 68th minute against Atlético Mineiro. He was added to the Brazilian national team to prepare for the World Cup 2018 in Russia, but failed to make the final selection. On 13 July 2018, he signed a five-year contract with Cercle Brugge.

On 28 July 2022, Vitinho signed for Burnley on a four-year deal.

Career statistics

References

1999 births
Living people
Footballers from Belo Horizonte
Brazilian footballers
Association football defenders
Campeonato Brasileiro Série A players
Belgian Pro League players
English Football League players
Cruzeiro Esporte Clube players
Cercle Brugge K.S.V. players
Burnley F.C. players
Brazilian expatriate footballers
Brazilian expatriate sportspeople in Belgium
Expatriate footballers in Belgium
Brazilian expatriate sportspeople in England
Expatriate footballers in England